Pelidnota kirbyi is a species of beetles of the family Scarabaeidae.

Subspecies
Pelidnota kirbyi misionesensis
Pelidnota kirbyi kirbyi

Description

Distribution
This species occurs in Brazil, Argentina and Paraguay.

References

Scarabaeidae
Beetles described in 1832
Taxa named by George Robert Gray